Lefkada is one of the regional units of Greece. It is part of the region of Ionian Islands. The capital of the regional unit is the town of Lefkada. The regional unit consists of the islands of Lefkada, Meganisi, Kalamos, Kastos and several smaller islands, all in the Ionian Sea.

Administration
The regional unit Lefkada is subdivided into 2 municipalities. These are (number as in the map in the infobox):

Lefkada (1)
Meganisi (2)

Prefecture
As a part of the 2011 Kallikratis government reform, the regional unit Lefkada was created out of the former prefecture Lefkada. The prefecture, created in 1864, had the same territory as the present regional unit. At the same time, the municipalities were reorganised, according to the table below.

See also
List of settlements in the Lefkada regional unit

References

 
2011 establishments in Greece
States and territories established in 2011
Prefectures of Greece
1864 establishments in Greece
Regional units of the Ionian Islands (region)